Jarryd James is the debut extended play (EP) by Australian alternative pop singer-songwriter and producer Jarryd James. The EP was released in United States of America on 3 September 2015, a week before his studio album was released in Australia.

Reception
Alternative Addictions gave the EP 3 out of 5 saying; "The five songs on this EP will give you a taste of what James does. He features some great rhythm lines underneath his honey piercing vocal" adding "While not being the dominant thing in the music all the time, the vocal from James is the primarily reason to listen to this EP. His vocal is amazing and just that side of the EP overall is worth listening to."

Track listing

References

2015 EPs
Indie pop EPs
EPs by Australian artists